The 1996 Volta a la Comunitat Valenciana was the 54th edition of the Volta a la Comunitat Valenciana road cycling stage race, which was held from 27 February to 2 March 1996. The race started in Calpe and finished in Valencia. The race was won by Laurent Jalabert of the  team.

General classification

References

Volta a la Comunitat Valenciana
Volta a la Comunitat Valenciana
Volta a la Comunitat Valenciana
Volta a la Comunitat Valenciana